Gregory Mark Kovacs (December 16, 1968 – November 22, 2013) was a Canadian IFBB professional bodybuilder. According to Canadian bodybuilding publication, Muscle Insider, Kovacs retired from competitive bodybuilding in 2005 to start his own business and coach competitive athletes.

Early life
Kovacs was born and raised in Niagara Falls, Ontario, Canada. He studied electrical engineering for one year in college, played travelling hockey and soccer before concentrating on his bodybuilding pursuits.

Bodybuilding

In the latter half of the 1990s, Greg Kovacs was the largest pro bodybuilder. According to Muscle Insider, his height: 6'4", he had an off-season weight of 420 pounds and Contest weight was 330 pounds, his arms measured 25 inches, his chest 70 inches, and his legs 35 inches. He has been reported to have developed over 27 inch arms in the prime of his career. Kovacs earned his IFBB Pro Card in 1996. In June 1997, he appeared on the cover of Flex magazine. His highest professional bodybuilding placing was 13th at the 2004 Arnold Classic.

Later life
On November 29, 2010, Kovacs was charged with extortion after a supplement store owner entered an Erin Mills bank to tell staff he was being extorted, and that a group of men had demanded he withdraw a large sum of money.

Death
Kovacs died on November 22, 2013 at approximately 9:50 PM, in his Mississauga, Ontario condominium from heart failure. He is survived by his parents and two sisters. Kovacs had no children.

Competition history
1996-  Canadian National Championships, 	1st
1997-	IFBB Night of Champions, 	16th
1998-	IFBB Ironman Pro Invitational, 	16th
2001-	IFBB Night of Champions, 	Did not place
2004-	Arnold Classic, 	13th
2005- Toronto Pro Invitational, Did not place

See also
List of male professional bodybuilders
List of female professional bodybuilders
Mr. Olympia

References

External links
musclememory.com Kovacs' profile
musculardevelopment.com No Bull Radio appearance, Monday, March 31, 2008

1968 births
2013 deaths
American bodybuilders
Sportspeople from Niagara Falls, Ontario
Professional bodybuilders